Shahid Haghani Expressway (Highway) is an expressway in Tehran. It starts from Resalat Expressway and ends in Vanak Square.

The expressway has 4 exits with 3 irregular Partial cloverleaf interchange and 1 traffic circle. There are three lanes of traffic in either direction for most of the length of the roadway. Traffic at Resalat Expressway enters and exits from Arabali Street. At Vanak Square traffic feeds from four different streets (Valiasr Street, Vanak Street, Molia Sadra Street, Brazil Street).

Attractions along expressway

 Taleghani Forest Park
 National Library
 Behesht Madaran Park
 Azadegan Park

Expressways in Tehran